Germany–Singapore relations refer to the bilateral relations between the Federal Republic of Germany and the Republic of Singapore.

History
A major impact made by Germany in modern history took place when the SMS Emden raided the South and Southeast Asia region during World War I. The light cruiser had made a daring raid of the British port of Penang soon after the war started, and brought the Malay Peninsula into the war. 

Following the Cold War between the 1970s and 1980s, West Germany Chancellor Helmut Schmidt maintained close ties with Singapore Prime Minister Lee Kuan Yew. An orchid hybrid was also named after Mrs Hannelore "Loki" Schmidt when she visited the Singapore Botanic Gardens in 1978.

Bilateral relations
Singapore and Germany began building relations more publicly after the breakup of the communist Soviet Union and the fall of the Iron Curtain that saw the unification of East Germany and West Germany.

On 10 August 1973, Singapore built the relations of East Germany.

Defence
Germany is a member of the NATO while Singapore remains as a member of the Commonwealth of Nations, both of which involve the United Kingdom as a leading member and ally. In 2015, the Singapore Army has undergone a major upgrade exercise of the armour arsenal that saw the Ministry of Defence procuring refurbished Leopard 2 tanks as the primary battle tank of armour-related operations since 2008. The Leopard 2 series eventually replaced all the aging French AMX-13 tanks in the 21st century, while bilateral military training exercises are held as recently as 2015 in the Bergen NATO Training Area of Germany.

Singapore and Germany signed a joint declaration of intent on cyber security cooperation on 6 July 2017. In accordance with declaration Singapore's Cyber Security Agency and Germany's Federal Foreign Office have regular information exchanges, and share best practices to promote innovation.

Trade and investment

As of 2015, leaders of both Germany and Singapore met in Berlin and are still working on a free trade agreement between Singapore and the European Union.

State visits
German Chancellor Schmidt continued making informal state visits as recent as 2012 when he met with long-time friend, former Singapore Prime Minister Lee Kuan Yew.
On 2 November 2017, President Halimah Yacob hosted a state banquet when German President Frank-Walter Steinmeier visited Singapore.

Academic Exchanges

Diplomatic Representations

Germany is represented in Singapore at the Deutsche Botschaft Singapur with Ambassador Dr Ulrich A. Sante while Singapore is represented in Germany at the Singapore Embassy near Potsdamer Platz by Ambassador Jai S Sohan.

See also 
 Foreign relations of Germany
 Foreign relations of Singapore

References

 
Singapore
Bilateral relations of Singapore